Frank Lee Crist was a United States Republican politician.

Crist served in the United States Army during World War I.  He served in the California legislature representing the 30th District from 1933 to 1935.

References

United States Army personnel of World War I
Members of the California State Legislature
1898 births
1961 deaths
People from Clarksville, Arkansas